Balmoral Park can mean:

 Balmoral Park, Illinois, a horse racing track in Crete, Illinois
 Balmoral Park, Lisburn, an exhibition and business park in Lisburn, Northern Ireland
It is also the name of two places in Australia